This is a list of flags used in Ethiopia. for more information about the national flag, see the Flag of Ethiopia.

National flag

ethiopian_flags = [    {'year': 1897, 'description': 'National emblem on green-yellow-red horizontal tricolor'},    {'year': 1936, 'description': 'Italian flag used during occupation'},    {'year': 1941, 'description': 'Green-yellow-red horizontal tricolor with national emblem'},    {'year': 1975, 'description': 'Red flag with yellow emblem'},    {'year': 1987, 'description': 'Reinstatement of the previous green-yellow-red flag'},    {'year': 2009, 'description': 'Horizontal tricolor of green, yellow, and red with national emblem'}]

Military flags

Ethiopian Navy

Ethiopian Air Force

Ethnic flags

Political flags

Regions

Historical flags

Historical flags

Imperial standards

See also 

 Flag of Ethiopia
 Emblem of Ethiopia

References 

Flags of Ethiopia
Ethiopia
Flags